The North Fork Stanislaus River is a  tributary of the Stanislaus River in the central Sierra Nevada and Stanislaus National Forest of eastern California.

Geography
The river flows southwest from Alpine County, through Calaveras County, to Tuolumne County.

The river begins at the confluence of Silver Creek and Duck Creek near the western edge of the Carson-Iceberg Wilderness in the Sierra Nevada. From there it flows southwest through a canyon to its confluence with the Middle Fork Stanislaus River near Forest Meadows, which forms the Stanislaus River.

Hydroelectricity infrastructure
Since the 1980s, the river basin has been extensively developed for hydropower generation. Water from the North Fork is stored in Alpine, Utica, Union and New Spicer Meadows Reservoirs, which regulate the water supply for McKays Point Diversion Dam, located lower down on the North Fork. From McKays Point water is diverted to the Collierville Powerhouse, which can generate up to 253 megawatts.

See also

List of rivers of California

References

Rivers of the Sierra Nevada (United States)
Stanislaus National Forest
Rivers of Alpine County, California
Rivers of Calaveras County, California
Rivers of Tuolumne County, California
Rivers of Northern California
Rivers of the Sierra Nevada in California